Edwin Michael Corboy is a justice with the Supreme Court of Western Australia. He commenced work as a solicitor at Norton Rose. He then joined Stone James (now King & Wood Mallesons) where he became a partner in 1987, and later became the Head of Litigation (Perth) in 1993.

References

Judges of the Supreme Court of Western Australia
Living people
Year of birth missing (living people)
Place of birth missing (living people)